Sainte-Marie (Vivaro-Alpine: Santa Maria) is a former commune in the Hautes-Alpes department in southeastern France. On 1 July 2017, it was merged into the new commune Valdoule.

Population

See also
Communes of the Hautes-Alpes department

References

Former communes of Hautes-Alpes